Darreh Hamyaneh-ye Sofla (also Romanized as Darreh Hamyāneh-ye Soflá; also known as Darhamyāneh-ye Pā’īn and Darreh Hambāneh-ye Pā’īn) is a village in Komehr Rural District, in the Central District of Sepidan County, Fars Province, Iran. At the 2006 census, its population was 166, in 38 families.

References 

Populated places in Sepidan County